is a retired long-distance runner from Japan. She represented her native country in the women's marathon at the 1988 Summer Olympics in Seoul, South Korea, alongside Eriko Asai and Kumi Araki. She won the silver medal in the women's marathon at the 1986 Asian Games in Seoul, South Korea.

International competitions

References
 Year Rankings
 sports-reference
 

1962 births
Living people
Japanese female long-distance runners
Japanese female marathon runners
Olympic female marathon runners
Olympic athletes of Japan
Athletes (track and field) at the 1988 Summer Olympics
Asian Games silver medalists for Japan
Asian Games medalists in athletics (track and field)
Athletes (track and field) at the 1986 Asian Games
Medalists at the 1986 Asian Games
Japan Championships in Athletics winners